The name Fiona has been used for seven tropical cyclones worldwide: three in the Atlantic Ocean, three in the Australian region, and one in the South-West Indian Ocean.

In the Atlantic:

 Tropical Storm Fiona (2010), moderate but disorganized tropical storm, moved in the central Atlantic without threatening land
 Tropical Storm Fiona (2016), weak tropical storm that churned across the open ocean
 Hurricane Fiona (2022), powerful, long-lived and devastating category 4 hurricane

In the Australian region:

 Cyclone Fiona (1971), severe tropical cyclone, made landfall in the northern coast of Australia. 
 Cyclone Fiona-Gwenda (1974), operationally considered to be two separate storms, but reduced to one in post-season analysis
 Cyclone Fiona (2003), brought significant rainfall to the Western Australia coast

In the South-West Indian: 

 Tropical Depression Fiona (1998), weak tropical cyclone that churned off the coast of Madagascar 

Atlantic hurricane set index articles
Australian region cyclone set index articles
South-West Indian Ocean cyclone set index articles